Dr. Juan de Dios Guevara Romero (March 1, 1910 – May 6, 2000) was a Peruvian chemist.

Biography

In 1931, Guevara joined the Faculty of Sciences of the National University of San Marcos, but in 1932 studied at the School of Chemistry and Pharmacy of Peru.

He entered teaching in 1936 as Assistant Professor of Analytical Chemistry and was appointed as a senior lecturer at the National University of San Marcos. Then he was elected dean of its faculty for two consecutive terms.

Juan de Dios Guevara never dissociated himself from San Marcos and became rector in November 1966, a position he held until October 1977. Another important position he took was the president of the National Council of Universities of Peru (CONUP) (1971–1977).

Initially he worked in the analytical laboratories of the Peruvian Corporation in 1937-1942; later he took charge of production in the Maldonado Laboratories, retiring after more than twenty years. San Marcos university recognised his work by making him a Professor Emeritus. 

The scientific contributions of Dr. Guevara have been published in the magazines "Farmacia Peruana", "Boletín de la Sociedad Química del Perú" and  "Boletín de Informaciones de Química Aplicada".

Among his outstanding articles are La química inorgánica y la nomenclatura moderna, El contenido de flúor en las aguas de consumo de la República del Perú,  Historia de la Sociedad Química del Perú and Restos de cocina dejado por precolombinos que habitaron la costa peruana. He also contributed to  books on organic chemistry, some of which are used on university courses in Chile.

Guevara was President of the Chemical Society of Peru, between 1962-1963 and 1980–1983, having organised in the first year the Latin American Chemistry Congress, held in Lima.

Juan de Dios Guevara received numerous awards, including the Cross of the Order of King Alfonso X from the Spanish government.

References
University of San Marcos

Peruvian chemists
1910 births
2000 deaths
People from Pisco, Peru
National University of San Marcos alumni
Academic staff of the National University of San Marcos
Recipients of the Civil Order of Alfonso X, the Wise